East Head Reservoir, also known as East Head Pond, is a  pond in Carver and Plymouth, Massachusetts, within the Myles Standish State Forest, located northeast of the forest headquarters, east of Barrett Pond, southwest of New Long Pond and College Pond, and northwest of Fearing Pond. The reservoir is the headwaters to the Wankinco River.

External links
Environmental Protection Agency

Ponds of Plymouth, Massachusetts
Ponds of Massachusetts